The Chevrolet Lumina is a mid-size car that was produced and marketed by the Chevrolet division of General Motors from 1989 until 2001.



Background 
The first generation of the Lumina replaced the Chevrolet Celebrity and Chevrolet Monte Carlo under a single nameplate; the mechanically unrelated Chevrolet Lumina APV minivan served as the successor for the Celebrity station wagon. The model line was based on the front-wheel-drive GM10 platform (later designated the GM W platform), shared with Buick, Oldsmobile, and Pontiac. For 1995, the second-generation Lumina was introduced, serving as a substantial exterior revision of the previous generation (the two-door coupe was renamed the Monte Carlo). For the 2000 model year, the Lumina was replaced by the Chevrolet Impala; the model line would retain the W platform through the 2016 model year.

Throughout its production, both generations of the Lumina were produced by General Motors Canada at Oshawa Car Assembly (Oshawa, Ontario). For markets outside of North America, the Chevrolet Lumina was derived from other large GM sedans. From 1998 to 2013, the Lumina was marketed in the Middle East and South Africa as a Chevrolet-badged version of the Holden Commodore produced in Australia. From 2005 to 2006, GM Philippines sold the Lumina as a Chevrolet-badged version of the Buick Regal (sharing much of its body with its American counterpart).

First generation (1990) 

The North American Chevrolet Lumina was based on the mid-size GM10 platform, which was shared with the Pontiac Grand Prix, Oldsmobile Cutlass Supreme, and Buick Regal. Although the Lumina became a popular seller, GM was widely criticized in the motoring press for being late to the game in introducing a direct aero-designed competitor to the Ford Taurus. The "Lumina" name was considered by Ford in the pre-production stage of the Taurus. Both body styles were available in base and sporty Euro trim, which was a successor to the Celebrity Eurosport.

Airbags were not yet available at the time of introduction so seat belts were installed in the front doors as "passive restraints". These belts were connected to the upper and lower portions of the front doors, and could remain latched while allowing front passengers the ability to enter and exit the vehicle without removing them. This technically satisfied US Government regulations concerning passive occupant safety requirements. GM was heavily criticized for the lack of airbags in Lumina, by 1993 the Ford Taurus, Honda Accord and Toyota Camry all came equipped with at least one front airbag.

The coupe and sedan were installed with MacPherson front struts, while the rear suspension used Chapman struts and a transverse-mounted fiberglass leaf spring, borrowing an approach used from the Chevrolet Corvette (C4) rear suspension.

The Chevrolet Lumina's first generation ended production in August 1994, making this the shortest-produced generation of the first-generation GM10 cars.

NASCAR 
In 1989, the Lumina became the nameplate under which Chevrolets were raced in NASCAR, more than a year before the model was available to the public. As a result, NASCAR received many letters complaining about the unfair advantage of Chevrolet racing an "aluminum" car.

Lumina Z34 

Starting in 1990, Chevrolet offered a high-performance version of the Lumina, the Lumina Z34. It came standard with the FE3 sport suspension package, the  LQ1 V6 engine shared with the Lumina Euro 3.4 (sedan), the 5-speed Getrag 284 manual transmission, dual exhaust, and 4-wheel anti-lock brakes. 

The Z34 also featured cosmetic changes to go along with the performance enhancements such as unique front and rear fascias, side skirts, a rear spoiler, a louvered hood, a unique steering wheel, and sport bucket seats, and an optional Bose stereo system. 

Performance figures included a 0-60 mph (0–97 km/h) time of 7.1 seconds, a 1/4 mile (~400 m) time of 15.5 seconds, a (limited) top speed of 113 mph, and a lateral acceleration of 0.79 g (7.7 m/s²). The only paint colors available for the Z34 were white, red, black, gray, silver, and light blue (added in 1993). In 1995, the Lumina Z34 was replaced with the Chevrolet Monte Carlo Z34.

Engines 
 1990–1992:  Iron Duke I4
 1993:  122 I4
 1990–1994:  LHO V6
 1991–1994:  LQ1 V6

Production

Second generation (1995) 

General Motors began the development of an updated Lumina in 1989, under chief engineer Norm Sholler, planned for a late 1992 launch. By 1991, a final body design was approved. Development eventually took longer than planned, delaying the launch by 18 months. The redesigned Lumina was unveiled at the Los Angeles Auto Show in January 1994 as a 1995 model. The 1995 Lumina received a rounded body, increasing its size, as well as an updated interior. Unlike its other W platform counterparts, the Lumina retained the first-generation chassis. Replacing the Lumina two-door coupe was the resurrected Monte Carlo. The LH0 V6 was dropped in favor of the L82 V6, known as the 3100 SFI; the latter engine produced 20 more horsepower from the same displacement due to a revised intake manifold and cylinder heads.

Initial trim levels consisted of base and LS; the latter replacing the "Euro" trim. Options included an electric sunroof, leather bucket seats, power windows, a power driver seat, and an AM/FM stereo with a CD player. This Lumina was available with police (code 9C3) and taxi packages, because the Chevrolet Caprice was discontinued after the 1996 model year. Production began on Monte Carlo coupes in February 1994 and March 7, 1994 for Lumina sedans at GM's Oshawa manufacturing plant, for a June 6, 1994 market launch for the 1995 model.

The LTZ trim was introduced in 1996 for the 1997 model year because the Impala SS and Caprice were discontinued.

Despite its increased torque, the 3.8 L LTZ demonstrated slightly worse performance due to its lowered horsepower, with 0-60 mph (0–97 km/h) times of 7.5 seconds (as opposed to 7.2 seconds for the LQ1) and 1/4 mile (~400 m) times of 15.7 seconds (as opposed to 15.5 seconds for the LQ1).

Also in 1997, the 1998 model year Luminas received second generation airbags. The front-wheel-drive Chevrolet Impala was introduced as a replacement for the Lumina in 2000, although GM produced 2001 model year Luminas to be exclusively sold for rental fleets. Retail sales of the Lumina ended in Canada in 1999, with the United States following a year later. Fleet production ended on April 26, 2001. In some Asian countries, the Lumina continued as a rebadged Buick Century/Regal.

Trim levels 
Throughout its life cycle, the second generation Lumina was available in three trim levels:

Base (1995–2001): The most popular Lumina had a standard front row bench seat with seating for six passengers, power locks, tilt steering wheel, dual airbags, and air conditioning. Base models were equipped with fifteen-inch steel wheels with wheel covers.

LS (1995–1999): The mid-level trim models included aluminum wheels, optional dual-zone temperature controls, power windows (optional on Base), tachometer, higher-end stereo with GM's Delcolock, anti-lock brakes, remote keyless entry system, upgraded seats, and an optional 3.4 L DOHC engine (1995-1996).

LTZ (1997–1999): The top-of-the-line Lumina included alloy wheels, a choice of the 3.1 L V6 engine, 3.4 L DOHC engine (1997), and the 3.8 L V6 engine (1998-1999), power driver seat, dual-zone climate control and leather with the option for deluxe cloth. A center console was standard on LTZ (optional on LS). Exterior differentiation included the front end, trunk lid, and taillights from the Fifth Generation Chevrolet Monte Carlo.

Engines 
 1995–1999  L82 V6
 1995–1997  LQ1 DOHC V6
 1998–1999  L36 V6
 2000–2001  LG8 V6

Production

Marketing 

Chevrolet signed a deal with The Walt Disney Company to make the 1990 Lumina the official car of the Disney-MGM Studios park, which opened in 1989. As part of this promotion, characters from Disney films were featured in early advertisements for the Lumina.

Safety

Insurance Institute for Highway Safety (IIHS)

NHTSA

Holden-based models 

The Australian GM subsidiary, Holden, manufactured a third and fourth generation Lumina based on the rear-wheel-drive Commodore (VX, VZ, and VE series) sedan and Ute coupé utility.

This model was exclusively manufactured for export primarily to the Middle East and South Africa. Luxury specifications of these sedans were also exported in Brazil as the Chevrolet Omega. In some Middle Eastern markets, the 3rd gen Commodore-based Lumina acted as the successor to the 2nd gen W-Body Lumina. 

High-performance models were powered by Chevrolet V8 engines, including the high specification Pontiac G8 based on the VE Series, exported to the United States.

Philippines model 

The Chinese-built Buick Regal was sold in the Philippines from 2005 to 2006 as the Chevrolet Lumina. GM had withdrawn from the Philippines in 1985 along with Ford, finding the political and economic situation there untenable. This left only Nissan and Mitsubishi operating in the Filipino market. In 1997, GM returned with the Opel brand, and introduced the Opel Vectra, Opel Omega, and, shortly thereafter, the Tigra and Astra. In 2000, Chevrolet returned with the Chevrolet Suburban and Chevrolet Savana, with GM dealerships being rebranded as GM AutoWorld. However, Opel struggled in the Filipino market, with Japanese automakers accounting for 80% of the total market by the year 2000. After the discontinuation of the Omega, the Vectra became Opel's largest sedan offering in the market. The Vectra struggled against rivals like the Nissan Cefiro, Honda Accord and Toyota Camry. GM withdrew the brand in 2003, leaving them without a car in the mid-size segment. In 2005, GM introduced the Chevrolet Lumina as a competitor to the growing mid-size sedan market.

The only engine offered was a 2.5 liter V6, producing 152 hp and 154 lb-ft of torque. Mated to the Lumina's engine was a four-speed automatic. It had a top speed of 173 km/h and a 0-100km/h time of 12.8 seconds. The exhaust system was equipped with a Euro 2 standard catalytic converter. 

Safety features included a four-wheel disc brake system with ABS, an onboard vehicle diagnosis system, a tire pressure monitor, integrated turn signal/headlight housing, five seatbelts and dual front airbags. The Lumina's body featured an integrated steel body structure with side impact protection. To prevent theft, the Lumina featured an engine immobilizer and a central locking system. 

Standard features included keyless entry, an eight-way power-adjustable driver's seat, remote trunk opener, power side mirrors, and a tilt adjustable leather-wrapped steering wheel with hydraulic power steering. The interior also featured leather seats, faux wood trim, a rear armrest, electronic climate control system, and a six speaker CD system. It was only available in three colors: white, silver, and black.

The Lumina is one out of two rebadged Chinese-market Buicks sold in the Philippines, the other being the Buick GL8-based Chevrolet Venture. Both are sourced from Shanghai GM. The car cost around P1.290M at the time and was quite a bit larger than the Vectra, measuring 20 inches longer and around 5 inches wider. This made it the largest car in its class, larger and wider than its main competitors, the Honda Accord and the Toyota Camry. The car was praised for being comfortable, spacious, and well-equipped, yet its design was criticized for being a "bit too bland".

The Lumina was short-lived. It was discontinued in 2006, with production of the Chinese market Regal halting in 2008. Sales were poor, making the Lumina a rare car in the Philippines. In 2013, Chevrolet Philippines introduced the Chevrolet Malibu as the successor to the Lumina. It would eventually be discontinued in 2021.

References

External links 

Lumina
Front-wheel-drive vehicles
Police vehicles
Mid-size cars
Sedans
Coupés
Cars introduced in 1989
1980s cars
1990s cars
2000s cars
Cars discontinued in 2001